Just Sylvia is the second album by country music singer Sylvia.  It was released in 1982 on RCA Records and was produced by Tom Collins.  It featured a number one country hit in the song "Nobody", a Kyle Fleming-Dennis Morgan composition. The song was not only a country smash, but a pop hit as well, peaking at number 15 on the Billboard Hot 100, and also becoming a top 5 Adult Contemporary hit.

Track listing
"Nobody" (Kye Fleming, Dennis Morgan) - 3:22
"Mirage" (Archie Jordan, Don Pfrimmer) - 3:26
"Sweet Yesterday" (Fleming, Morgan) - 3:49 	
"You're a Legend in Your Own Mind" (Fleming, Morgan) - 3:37
"You Can't Go Back Home" (Fleming, Morgan) - 4:16
"Like Nothing Ever Happened" (Fleming, Morgan) - 3:44
"I'll Make It Right with You" (Charles Quillen, Pfrimmer) - 3:34
"Not Tonight" (Steve Dean, John Jarrard) - 3:40
"I Feel Cheated" (Quillen, Sue Patton) - 3:18
"The Mill Song (Everybody's Got a Dream)" (Fleming, Morgan) - 3:38

Personnel
Sylvia - lead vocals
The Cherry Sisters, Kye Fleming, George Grantham, Sherilyn Huffman, Lisa Silver, Diane Tidwell - backing vocals
Dennis Morgan, Jimmy Capps - acoustic and electric guitars
Pete Bordonali, Fred Newell - electric guitars, mandolin
David Briggs - keyboards, piano
Archie Jordan - piano
Shane Keister, Bobby Ogdin - synthesizers
Joe Osborn - bass
Kenny Malone, Buster Phillips - drums
Nashville String Machine - strings 

Production
Produced By Tom Collins
Recorded & Engineered By Bill Harris

Charts

1982 albums
Sylvia (singer) albums
RCA Records albums
Albums produced by Tom Collins (record producer)